Glyphodes cyanomichla, the blue glyphodes moth, is a moth of the family Crambidae. It is endemic to the Hawaiian islands of Kauai, Oahu, Molokai and Hawaii.

The larvae feed on cultivated mulberry and Pseudomorus brunoniana.

External links

Endemic moths of Hawaii
Moths described in 1899
Glyphodes